The Korean Broadcasting System (KBS) is the national broadcaster of South Korea. Founded in 1927, it is one of the leading South Korean television and radio broadcasters.

KBS operates seven radio networks, ten television channels, and multiple Internet-exclusive services. Its flagship terrestrial television stations KBS1 broadcasts on channel 9, while KBS1 sister channel KBS2, an entertainment oriented network, broadcasts on channel 7. KBS also operates the international service KBS World, which provides television, radio, and online services in twelve different languages.

History

Early radio broadcasts

The KBS began as Keijo Broadcasting Station (경성방송국, 京城放送局) with call sign JODK, established by the Governor-General of Korea on 16 February 1927. After Korea was liberated from Japanese rule at the end of World War II, this second radio station started using the call sign HLKA in 1947 after the Republic of Korea was granted the ITU prefix HL. After doing a national broadcast, the radio was renamed Seoul Central Broadcasting Station in 1948.

1950s–1960s – Move into television
Television broadcasts in South Korea began on 12 May 1956 with the first television station HLKZ-TV. After financial difficulties, it was acquired by KBS in 1961.

1970s – Expansion
KBS station status changed from government to broadcasting station on 3 March 1973. Construction of KBS headquarters in Yeouido started in 1976. In 1979 KBS radio began broadcasting on the FM band with the launch of KBS Stereo (now KBS 1FM). Colour television began that year.

1980s – Advertising started after controversial merger
KBS began accepting advertising in 1980, differing from the norm of advert-free broadcasting by public broadcasters, after the forced merger of several private broadcasters into KBS by the military government of Chun Doo-hwan (see Controversies).

1990s – Spinoff of EBS
In 1981, KBS launched KBS 3TV and Educational FM and on 27 December 1990, the channels split from KBS to form the Educational Broadcasting System (EBS).

After a revision of the television licensing fee system in 1994, 1TV and Radio1 stopped broadcasting commercials.

2010s
After first broadcasting HD programmes in 2001, KBS completely transferred to digital broadcasting in 2012.

On 3 March 2013, computer shutdowns hit South Korean television stations including the KBS. The South Korean government asserted a North Korean link in the March cyberattacks, which has been denied by Pyongyang.

In 2013, KBS World Radio commemorated its 60th anniversary, and KBS World TV celebrated 10 years of its foundation.

In 2014, KBS World 24 was launched, mainly for Koreans abroad.

In 2015, KBS was honored to have its archives of the KBS Special Live Broadcast, Finding Dispersed Families, inscribed on the UNESCO Memory of the World Register. This makes KBS only the world's second broadcaster to have a broadcast programme on the prestigious list.

The KBS network dedicated to deliver the exclusive Special Live Broadcast, Finding Dispersed Families, via its primary channel, KBS1. KBS News served as the program's producer. The program made its premiere telecast on 10:15 pm KST on 30 June 1983. After more than 6 months, the special live programme ended at 4 am on 14 November 1983. This marks a total duration of 453 hours and 45 minutes of live broadcast over the period of 138 days, aired nationwide on KBS1. The whole live broadcast was recorded. The KBS's archives of Special Live Broadcast, Finding Dispersed Families include; 463 video tapes of the original recordings, and many kinds of associated materials, generated in the course of the extraordinary broadcast, such as the posters carrying the participating dispersed family members' capsule stories, cue sheets, programming schedules, radio recording materials, and related photographs. A total of 20,522 such assorted materials have been preserved in the archives. The program was the biggest public affairs program ever produced by KBS in the decade, and was the first to tackle the issue of families separated because of the long Korean War (1950–1953), which garnered even international coverage.

In 2017, KBS launched the world's first terrestrial UHD broadcasting service.

In June 2018, KBS led the operation of the IBC (International Broadcasting Centre) inside the KINTEX (Korea International Exhibition Center), located in Goyang City, as Host Broadcaster for the April 2018 inter-Korean summit. During the summit, KBS successfully delivered all the moments associated with the historic summit for more than 3,000 local and overseas media representatives, gathered at the IBC. Throughout the day of the summit, KBS delivered live coverage and the latest developments of the event through its continuous special news bulletins. Also, its prime-time news programmes, KBS News 9 and KBS Newsline provided audiences with highlights and implications of the historic summit through comprehensive and analytical reports. Also, KBS World TV delivered Live Coverage of April 2018 Inter-Korean summit with English subtitles for its audiences across 117 countries worldwide.

In May 2019, as the public service broadcaster in South Korea, KBS undertook a major reform in its Disaster Broadcast System in order to provide exclusive emergency services for people in the country in times of emergency. To be headed by President and CEO of KBS, the renewed system will allow the use of maximum resources of the organization under emergency circumstances. Under the reform, KBS will focus on; swift and efficient emergency broadcast and coverage; to deliver essential information in innovative ways with the ultimate aim to minimise losses and damages; to strengthen its digital platforms to better serve a wide-ranging audience groups. In particular, KBS signed contracts with nine sign language interpreters in an effort to enhance broadcast services for audiences with disabilities. In addition, KBS is committed to improve its English subtitle services for people from overseas.

Structure

KBS is a public corporation (공사, 公社) funded by the South Korean government and license fees, but is managed independently. As part of the Constitution, the president of KBS is chosen by the President of South Korea, after being recommended by its board of directors. Political parties in South Korea also have the right to name members of the KBS board of directors.

Because of this system, which gives politicians effective control over choosing the president of KBS, as well as its board of directors, people who are critical of the system cite political intervention in KBS's governance as reason for revising the current system of recruiting.

In order to uphold and defend independence, KBS, since 2018, created a 'Public Advisory Group', as part of the selection process of new KBS President and CEO. New President and CEO of KBS is recommended by the KBS Board of Governors, once the selection process by the Group is completed. The Group examines Presidential candidates in the form of a presentation, a panel discussion, and an interview. New President and CEO of KBS will finally be appointed by the President of Republic of Korea, after going through the mandatory parliamentary audit by the National Assembly.

Around 49% of KBS's revenue comes from a mandatory television licence fee of 2,500 won, with another 18.7% coming from commercial advertisement sales.

In addition to 18 regional stations and 12 overseas branches, there are eight subsidiary companies such as KBSN, KBS Business and KBS Media, which manage KBS content.

CEOs

Channels

Terrestrial television 
 KBS1 – KBS's flagship channel, it broadcasts news and current affairs, education, drama, sports, children's programming and culture. It launched in 1961 as HLKA-TV and is solely funded by the license fee, airing commercial-free. It is available nationally on channel 9, broadcasting via digital terrestrial television. KBS1 also airs public information films and minor entertainment programming, the majority of which is on KBS2.
 KBS2 – KBS's entertainment and drama channel, it was launched in 1980 as a replacement for the Tongyang Broadcasting Corporation, which was controversially merged with KBS. It is available on digital channel 7 via digital terrestrial television. KBS2 also airs live sports coverage, children's programming, public information films and less news and current affairs programming, the majority of which is on KBS1.
 KBS UHD – the Ultra High-Definition channel, using the ATSC 3.0 format. The channel airs music videos, plus re-runs of TV series and various programming.
 KBS NEWS D – 24-hour news channel, based on the broadcaster's own streaming news channel, KBS 24. Also serves as the country's emergency alert channel on ATSC 3.0.

While KBS1 and KBS2 phased out analogue services on 31 December 2012 as part of the switchover to digital television in South Korea, it would appear that KBS1 and KBS2 is still unofficially broadcast in analog via UHF, presumably nearby the DMZ, albeit using the SECAM D/K standard.

Cable and satellite television 
 KBS Life – A culture and drama channel, launched in 1995 as KBS Satellite 2. It was renamed as KBS Korea in 2002, renamed as KBS Prime in 2006, renamed as KBS N Life in 2015 before becoming KBS Life.
 KBS Drama – formerly KBS Sky Drama, launched in 2002
 KBS N Sports – formerly KBS Sports/KBS Sky Sports, launched in 2002
 KBS Joy – a comedy and quiz show channel that was launched in 2006
 KBS Kids – the children's channel, launched in 2012
 KBS Story – a channel aimed at a female audience, launched in 2021

These six channels are carried by cable and satellite operators in South Korea. There are 100+ cable operators in South Korea, and Skylife is the sole satellite television service provider. These channels are managed and operated by KBS N, a subsidiary company of KBS.

KBS World 

KBS World is the international television and radio service of KBS. It was officially launched on 1 July 2003. It is broadcast on a 24-hour schedule with programs including news, sports, television dramas, entertainment, and children's. KBS World television is broadcast locally and around the world. As of July 2007, around 65% of its programs are broadcast with English subtitles, it is available in 32 countries, and reportedly more than 40 million households around the world can access KBS World. It has two overseas subsidiaries: KBS America and KBS Japan. KBS Japan is independently operated by a KBS subsidiary in Japan, and most programs are provided with Japanese subtitles.

KBS World television is a television channel that mainly broadcasts programs commissioned for KBS's 2 terrestrial networks: KBS1 and KBS2. KBS World television is distributed over several international communication and broadcasting satellites such as IS-19, IS-20, IS-21, Measat 3, Apstar 6 & 7, Eutelsat Hotbird 13A, Galaxy 11, 18 & 23, Badr 6, Vinasat 1, Palapa D, SES 7, Telkom 1, Thaicom 5, EchoStar 15, Anik F3. Local cable and/or satellite operators receive the signal from one of these satellite and carry the signal to end subscribers of their own networks. KBS doesn't allow individual viewer to receive the signal from IS-19, IS-20, IS-21, Measat 3, Asiasat 5, and Galaxy 18. The signal from Badr 6 and Eutelsat Hotbird 13A is Free-to-Air.

KBS World TV commenced its serve via YouTube in 2007. Its YouTube subscriber count reached 10 million in May 2019, and recorded 13.5 million in July 2020.
KBS World TV is also available on various social media platforms such as Facebook, Twitter, Instagram, and LINE. Its social media surpassed 20 million subscribers in April 2020.

KBS Korea (previously KBS World 24), a spin-off channel of KBS World, is targeting at Koreans living overseas.

Radio 
 KBS Radio 1 (711 kHz AM/97.3 MHz FM KBS Radio Seoul) – News, current affairs, drama, documentary, and culture. Launched in 1927 as Kyeongseong Broadcasting Corporation JODK and it became KBS Radio 1 in 1965.
 KBS Radio 2 (603 kHz AM/106.1 MHz FM KBS Happy FM) – Popular music. Launched in 1948 as HLSA.
 KBS Radio 3 (1134 kHz AM/104.9 MHz FM KBS Voice of Love FM) – Launched in 1980 and ceased broadcasting in 1981. It was later replaced by KBS Radio 2's regional radio service and Educational FM (now EBS FM). Later re-launched in 2000 as a spin-off from KBS Radio 2. For the first time in 2010, it was launched on FM and restructured as a radio station for the disabled.
 KBS 1FM (93.1 MHz Classic FM) – classical music and folk music. Launched in 1979 as KBS Stereo, adopted current name in 1980.
 KBS 2FM (89.1 MHz/DMB CH 12B Cool FM) – popular music. Launched in 1966 as Radio Seoul Broadcasting (RSB), renamed as TBC-FM in the 1970s, renamed as KBS Radio 4 in 1980 after TBC-FM forced merger to KBS, then adopted current name in 2003.
 KBS Hanminjok Radio (literal meaning: KBS Korean Nationality Radio) (6.015 MHz shortwave and 1170 kHz mediumwave) – launched in 1975 as KBS Third Programme
 KBS World Radio – the South Korean international radio service, funded directly by the government.

Branding logo

Programmes

Foreign partners

Americas

Europe

Asia

Oceania

Operational status

Headquarters
KBS carried out a large-scale organizational reform on 1 March 2019. The focus of the reform is to; further strengthen the KBS's capabilities of content creation; enhance the organization's digital work flow; and improve audience services. As part of the new strategy, KBS created Content Production 2 Division, a new integral body, responsible for a highly efficient operation of production, marketing, as well as content businesses. The new division ultimately aims to bring outstanding dramas and entertainment programming by boosting creative nature of the production function, and minimizing its decision-making process.

The new reform strategy introduced Public Service Media Strategy team under Strategy and Planning Division. Public Service Media Strategy is mainly responsible for developing KBS's digital strategies for different audiences to enjoy KBS content via assorted digital media platforms. The reform brought changes in Programming Division as Digital Media department has further expanded its roles under the division. Digital News department attached to News and Sports Division has also strengthened its functions in line with the recent reform initiative. Another significant change in the reform is that new 'Audience Relations Center' has become an executive department, to be operated directly by KBS President and CEO. The Audience Relations Center will dedicate its resources to further enhance audience services, and create more opportunities for audiences to take part in various initiatives developed by KBS. And Local Stations Management has been reorganized to be supervised under KBS Executive Vice President, as KBS has a plan to build a regional broadcasting system in response to a growing demand for greater regional autonomy.

Controversies

KBS, as one of Korea's oldest broadcasters, had more controversies than SBS and MBC. It also earned nicknames such as Soonkyu Bangsong and The Department of Last Resort.

1980 – Forced merger of KBS with private broadcasters
During the Chun Doo-hwan regime of the eighties, the president passed a law to force several public broadcasters to merge with the public-run KBS. After these broadcasters had shown news stories against Chun, he used this law to stifle their criticism of him. It included:
 Tongyang Broadcasting Corporation (TBC)
 Donga Broadcasting System (DBS)
 Seohae Broadcasting Corporation (SBC)
 Jeonil Broadcasting Corporation (VOC)
 Hanguk-FM
Munhwa Broadcasting Corporation (MBC) was also affected. MBC was, at first, a federation of 20 loosely affiliated member stations located in various parts of Korea. Although they shared much of their programming, each member station was privately owned. After the consolidation, however, affiliates were forced to give up a majority of shares to the MBC based in Seoul. MBC Seoul, in turn, was forced to give up 65% of its shares to KBS.

Consequences
 TBC television became KBS2, and TBC Radio was split into two and became KBS 2FM and KBS Radio 3.
 DBS became the now-defunct KBS Radio Seoul. The frequency is now used by SBS Love FM.
 SBC became KBS Gunsan, now known as KBS Radio 3 Jeonju
 VOC became KBS Radio 3 Gwangju.
 Hanguk-FM became KBS-Daegu-FM.
In 2009, president Lee Myung-bak said that the law was unconstitutional, and in 2011 TBC and DBS were revived as JTBC and Channel A, respectively.

2002 – KBS 2FM advertisement scandal 

KBS 2FM From 1980 until 2002 was prohibited to air commercial advertisements but in 2002 commercial advertisements resumed airing on KBS 2FM. The result KBS Local FM (a radio station owned by KBS used to air selected programs of KBS 1FM and KBS 2FM through a cross-broadcast schedule nationally) instead carried KBS 1FM programs even though only one KBS 2FM program Good Morning Pops where aired due to that the said program is prohibited to air advertisements excluding those of KOBACO (Korea Broadcast Advertising Corporation). However, after 15 years since the abolishment of national broadcasts Park Myeong-su's Radio Show is aired on local KBS Happy FM stations in Busan, Changwon, Cheongju, Daejeon and Jeju starting April 2016 (and in June 2019 the program is also aired in the Gangwon-do region) this was due to its popularity and being consistently viral in internet search engines and on SNS (social media sites) this development marked the resumption of Cool FM's national broadcasts this time using the Local Happy FM network in the provinces, afterwards KBS Gayo Plaza (currently presented by Lee Gi-kwang) is aired in all Local Happy FM stations starting September 2016 for the same reasons, Good Morning Pops which was aired on the Local FM stations moved to Local Happy FM stations in February 2017 with this development the show is no longer aired on Local FM stations, on August 31, 2020, Kim Do-yeon's Fresh Morning also started national broadcast on all Local Happy FM stations and finally Lee Geum-hee's A good day to love also aired in selected Local Happy FM stations in Gangwon-do, Gwangju and Jeju due to its high ratings starting on August 2, 2021.

2008~2009 – 1 Night 2 Days Exhibition of Smoking and profanity

2011 – Wiretapping scandal at TV license fee meeting 
In 2011, Sohn Hak-kyu, the chairman of the opposition Democratic Party, accused KBS of wiretapping the party's closed-door meeting on TV subscription charges.

Sohn said, "We believe the firm bugged the meeting to secure information about our party's handling of the TV subscription policy. KBS should admit that it resorted to the deplorable method of gathering information."

The ruling Grand National Party initially sought to put a bill concerning the TV subscription charge to a vote. However, it failed to do so amid strong opposition from the Democrats.

The National Assembly's subcommittee on culture, tourism, broadcasting and communication, was scheduled to deliberate on 28 June 2011, but the meeting was cancelled due to the Democrats' protest.

The scandal erupted on 23 June when Han Sun-kyo, chairman of the parliamentary subcommittee, criticized the Democrats' opposition to increasing the TV subscription charge during a subcommittee meeting.

The GNP lawmakers eventually approved a bill raising the charge by 1,000 won to 3,500 won at a subcommittee meeting in the absence of Democrat lawmakers. That led to a Democrat boycott of a June extraordinary parliamentary session for half a day on 21 June 2011.

2011 – Praising Chinilpa 
Bak Han-yong (박한용), head of the Institute for Research in Collaborationist Activities, criticized KBS for censoring negative remarks from a documentary about Chinilpa individuals, and Rhee Syngman, who had pardoned them. This includes the Chinilpa Paik Sun-yup.

2012 – KBS2 Carriage dispute 
On 16 January 2012, a dispute broke out between KBS and the Korea Cable TV Association (KCTA) over carriage fees. KCTA sought to reduce fees from major national networks for carrying their feeds through subscription providers. KBS had demanded to charge 280 won per subscriber, while the TV providers limited their offer to 100 won per subscription. Negotiations reached a standstill, and so the providers decided to stop carrying KBS2 nationwide starting from 3:00 p.m. (KST) on that same day. Due to loss in viewership, KBS2 experienced major decline in their ratings, majorly affecting shows like Brain at the time. Following the blackout, the Korea Communications Commission (KCC) has ordered the TV providers to resume distributing the channel or face a hefty fine. They initially refused, but on 17 January, they agreed to resume the channel's carriage after 28 hours.

2012 – KBS journalists strikes and Reset KBS News 9 
The journalists working for KBS (along with MBC, SBS and YTN) have protested against the biased journalism practices that favor the Lee Myung-bak government. The new union for KBS headed by Kim Hyeon-seok released a video clip "Reset KBS News 9" (리셋 KBS 뉴스9) on the internet that discusses the Prime Minister's Office Civilian Surveillance Incident and the controversial money-spending on renovating President Lee Myung-bak's alleged birth house on 13 March 2012.

2013 – You Are The Best! name controversy

Global Youth League DN filed an injunction at Seoul Central District Court against KBS for using the name "Lee Soon-shin" in the title of the drama. The injunction requested KBS to (1) immediately stop the broadcast, (2) remove "Lee Soon-shin" from the title, and (3) change the name of one of its characters. The group claimed that historical figure Lee Soon-shin (or Yi Sun-sin), an admiral famed for his victories against the Japanese Navy in the Imjin War during the Joseon Dynasty, is an official national symbol whose status will "deteriorate" when associated with the "weak and clumsy" protagonist that lead actress IU plays. KBS and production company AStory responded that they had no plans of changing the title or character name. Instead, they altered the original drama poster where several cast members are sitting on a pile of 100 won coins that have an image of Admiral Yi, by digitally replacing the coins with a plain gold platform.

2014~2015 – The Return of Superman controversies 
 On June 5, 2014 netizens on the forum site Daum Agora started a petition to have Kim Jung-tae and his son Yakkung removed from the show due to him and his son attending an election campaign on June 1, 2014, for Na Dong-yeon who is a candidate for Yangsan, South Gyeongsang's mayor. Na Dong-yeon later released a statement apologizing to Kim Jung-tae and his son Yakkung for the controversy and assured people that the actor and his son were not there to campaign for him. On June 10 a rep for Kim Jung-tae confirmed that he and his son Yakkung have decided to leave the show following the political controversy.
 In June 2014, an article was published voicing netizens complaints of the show overly promoting YG Entertainment artistes since there were too many guest stars from YG's management for Jang Hyun-sung and Tablo's segments, who are also under YG's management.
 On episode 42 which aired on August 31, 2014, producers took a jab at rival show "Dad! Where Are We Going?" with captions shown during Tablo's segment.
 Viewers voiced their complaints of the mothers showing up on the show too frequently. The complaints were targeted at Tablo's family due to his wife Hyejung appearing entirely during their segment from episodes 52 to 53.
 Viewers voiced their complaints about the editing of a scene in episode 53 where Song triplets Daehan and Manse are fighting over a toy. The viewers complained that the caption and editing didn't show the true facts of what happened.
 On April 22, 2015, the owner of a venue that the show production team had scouted, posted on the show's official forum claiming staff from the show had reserved his venue last minute and then abruptly cancelled the shoot, disregarding his loss of profit in order to accommodate the show. After a formal apology was issued by the shows producers' the misunderstanding was settled.
 In July 2015, the announcement of Lee Dong-gook and his family joining the show was met with negativity and complaints from fans of Song Il-kook and his triplet sons. Fans of Song and his sons saw it as a sign that Song and his family would be leaving the show, and complained on KBS's forum about adding the new family and KBS offering Song an upcoming drama role as a reason for Song to leave the variety show. KBS assured Song's fans that the decision for him and his family to leave the show was made entirely of their own accord.

2014 – 1st KBS strike against pro-government bias of its president
In early May 2014, Gil Hwan-young removed the KBS news chief after alleged improper remarks over the sinking of the ferry Sewol. The chief then accused Gil of interference with news editing, with an alleged pro-government bias.

After the board postponed a decision on whether or not to dismiss Gil, two of the broadcaster's largest unions went on strike.

As a result of the boycott, most of the broadcaster's news output was affected. The hour-long KBS News 9 ran for just 20 minutes, and during local elections on 4 June 2014, KBS was unable to send reporters to interview candidates.

The strike ended after the board of directors voted to dismiss Gil. The board passed a motion on 5 June 2014 demanding the discharge of President Gil. The majority vote decision was sent to be approved by the country's president Park Geun-hye, who has the power to appoint the broadcaster's head.

2017 – 2nd KBS strike against pro-government bias of its president 

In August 2017, KBS union decided to hold a strike, which began on 4 September, due to allegedly influencing news coverage to be in favor of former president Park Geun-hye's administration. As a result of the boycott, there has been a severe reduction in the airing of KBS news programs, culture programs, radio shows, and variety shows due to most staff members taking part in the strike. During its strike, the 2017 KBS Entertainment Awards was cancelled. After 141 days, the strike was over when the broadcasting company's board of directors approved the dismissal of KBS president Ko Dae-young.

See also

 Educational Broadcasting System
 KBS World Radio
 KBS America
 KBS World Canada
 KBS Symphony Orchestra
 KBS Hall
 Television in South Korea
 Korean Central Television (equivalent in North Korea)

References

External links 

 KBS.co.kr – official KBS Website 
 World.KBS.co.kr  – official KBS World website 
 KBS America

 
Mass media companies of South Korea
Korean-language television stations
Publicly funded broadcasters
Television networks in South Korea
Mass media companies established in 1927
Radio stations established in 1927
Television channels and stations established in 1961
1927 establishments in Korea
Yeouido